Despeñaperros Castle, also known as San José Castle, is a castle built in the 11th century in the historic center of Cartagena, Murcia Region in Spain. It was declared a cultural site on 7 August 1997. The walls are composed of masonry and generally flat. The interior of the fortification is divided in two perimeters, the lower with rooms for the occupants and a water reservoir, and an upper space occupied by the cannons, and which has lost gunships.

References

Bien de Interés Cultural landmarks in the Region of Murcia
Buildings and structures in Cartagena, Spain
Castles in the Region of Murcia